Camp Scheideck, California is an unincorporated community in Ventura County in Southern California within the Cuyama Valley about  due north of Ojai 

Geography
It is situated on Reyes Creek within the Los Padres National Forest  from a county road leading from Lake of the Woods to California State Route 33.

Climate
The climate of Camp Scheideck is Mediterranean, characterized by hot, dry summers, at times exceeding , and mild, rainy winters, with lows at night falling below freezing at times.
Flash floods and heavy snowfall can happen trapping residents inside the river crossings for a few days.

History

Founding and growth

According to Bonnie Ketterl Kane of the Ridge Route Communities Museum and Historical Society, the community was founded in 1888 by Martin Scheideck of Germany, who traveled with a friend, Gebhardt Wegis, "to avoid mandatory enlistment in the army."

[T]he two adventurers . . . walked from San Luis Obispo to Upper Cuyama[,] where they felt they found an area that reminded them of southern Germany. Both claimed homesteads near the Reyes family[,] who had been grazing cattle in the mountain valleys since the 1850s. Gebhardt married one of the Reyes daughters, Rosa, establishing the Wegis name in that area.

According to Kane, Scheideck built an adobe house and store with a wine cellar "and was known to serve hard cider to postal customers and candy in a bucket for the children. He was said to have been called "Judge Scheideck" after an "itinerant lawyer" left him a set of lawbooks, which he studied and "put to use in settling disputes."

A two-story wooden building was erected around 1900 to establish the Ozena station of the U.S. Post Office. As time passed, Sheideck built a lodge and tiny cabins along the Ozena Creek.

In 1975 there were only two couples living year around in the settlement, one of which was Barbara and Harold Brake, who owned the gas station, bar, store and dance hall. By 1992 the permanent population had grown to nine residents, Bugs and Frances Lackey, Uncle Vane Fort. J.R. and Rose Putzier, Betsy Paine. John (The Painter) Hilton, Frances Hawkins. and Stephanie Rogers, according to a Los Angeles Times reporter, who called the settlement "a self-contained mountain colony" with no telephone service and only two mobile phones for communication outside the Ozena Valley.

Ownership
The property was owned by the Scheideck family for nine decades. Eugene Scheideck's nephew, also named Eugene, was 81 years old when he had it in 1975. In 1978, however, Jim Cory, an Oxnard auto dealer, and four others bought the land from Jim Scheideck of Taft, and in 1990 it was sold to Ozzie Osborn, a rancher and plumbing contractor.

Reputation
Published accounts of Camp Scheideck have stressed its unusual nature. The Ridge Route Communities Museum and Historical Society, for example, noted that "Judge" Scheideck ran egg hunts on both Easter Sunday and Halloween, which was Scheideck's birthday, and the custom was still being observed in 2013.

In July 1979 a golf tournament was held on a course "scratched into" the surface of the landscape, dodging "bushes, gullies and rattlesnake holes." Instead of greens, the course had "browns." Golf clubs were made from tree limbs of plastic pipe, or a croquet mallet. Tennis balls were used instead of golf balls; three-gallon containers replaced standard golf cups. Proceeds were turned over to a 4-H Club.

Then two right turns take the car onto dirt and, in two crossings, through the winding Cuyama River before climbing again, this time over a mesa into a mile-long gash in the Earth called Ozena Valley. A long way for a beer.

But people find it. Some, from seeing a small, ridiculous sign on the paved Lockwood Valley Road: "Scheideck's Lodge. Cocktails and dining. Turn here, go in 1.5 miles." But most simply hear about it from the people who call Scheideck's home, the people who live here in cabins only steps from the bar. . . .

Scheideck's Lodge, while a curiosity to the day-tripper and oasis for hikers at nearby Reyes Creek Campground, performs many functions beyond pulling tap beer and keeping a jukebox current with Hank Williams Jr. and Bonnie Raitt. The bar is a window into a self-contained mountain colony, a tavern-as-nexus where information is traded in a phoneless society.

Amenities
The bar and grill was closed permanently in August 2020 due to the business owner not keeping up with permitting and licenses required to run a bar.
There are a myriad of old cabins, a mock cemetery called "Boot Hill," and a chapel where weddings have been performed. The place is a destination or a stopover for motorcycle riders.

In August 2011 the 120-year-old lodge was owned by Tony Virgilio.

References

Unincorporated communities in Ventura County, California
Cuyama Valley
Los Padres National Forest
Unincorporated communities in California
1888 establishments in California
Populated places established in 1888